Iakovos Milentigievits Alifieris (alternate spelling: Milentijević) (Greek: Ιάκωβος Μιλεντίγιεβιτς Αλιφιέρης; born January 11, 1997) is a Greek professional basketball player. He is 1.90 m (6 ft 2  in) tall. He can play at both the point guard and shooting guard positions.

Professional career
After playing  in the Greek 4th Division, during the 2014–15 season, with Aigaleo, Milentigievits began his pro career with the Greek 2nd Division club Doukas, during the 2015–16 season. In 2017, he moved to the Greek 1st Division club Koroivos, for the 2017–18 season.

National team career
Milentigievits played at the 2014 FIBA Under-17 World Cup, the 2015 FIBA Europe Under-18 Championship, where he won a gold medal, and at the 2017 FIBA Europe Under-20 Championship, where he also won a gold medal.

Personal life
Milentigievits' father is a Serbian former basketball player, and his mother is Greek. He also has a younger sister named Elena, who is volleyball player that played with Olympiacos women's volleyball.

References

External links
FIBA Profile
FIBA Europe Profile
Eurobasket.com Profile
Greek Basket League Profile 
Greek Basket League Profile 
RealGM.com Profile

1997 births
Living people
Aigaleo B.C. players
Doukas B.C. players
Greek people of Serbian descent
Greek men's basketball players
Ionikos Nikaias B.C. players
Koroivos B.C. players
Point guards
Shooting guards
Basketball players from Athens